Sunday Island may refer to:

Australia
 Sunday Islet (Queensland)
 Sunday Island (Victoria)
 Sunday Island (Exmouth Gulf), Western Australia
 Sunday Island (King Sound), Western Australia
 Sunday Island (Shark Bay), Western Australia

Other
 Raoul Island, also called "Sunday Island", Kermadec Islands, New Zealand
 Sunday Island (Sri Lanka), a Sri Lankan newspaper